Bandhalu Anubandhalu is a 1982 Indian Telugu-language film starring Sobhan Babu and Lakshmi with Chiranjeevi in a key special appearance. This is Chiranjeevi's 50th film. This is the remake of Kannada movie Avala Hejje.

Cast 
Chiranjeevi
Shoban Babu
Lakshmi
Ranganath
Mada

Soundtrack 
Soundtrack was composed by KV Mahadevan.
Punnami Jabili - S. P. Balasubrahmanyam
Sarigama - S. P. Balasubrahmanyam, P. Susheela
Evadi Pichi - Ramesh, Ramola
Unnadamma - P Susheela

References

External links
 

1982 films
Films scored by K. V. Mahadevan
Telugu remakes of Kannada films
1980s Telugu-language films
Films directed by H. R. Bhargava